Barkhad Abdi (born April 10, 1985) is a Somali-American actor. He made his acting debut as Somali pirate Abduwali Muse in the biographical drama film Captain Phillips (2013), which earned him a British Academy Film Award for Best Actor in a Supporting Role, along with Academy Award, Golden Globe Award, and Screen Actors Guild Award nominations.

Following his breakthrough, Abdi appeared in the films Eye in the Sky (2015), Good Time (2017), The Pirates of Somalia (2017), and Blade Runner 2049 (2017). Outside of film, he was featured as a series regular on the second season of the Hulu horror anthology Castle Rock (2019).

Early life
Barkhad Abdi was born to Majeerteen parents on April 10, 1985, in Mogadishu, Banaadir, Somalia. Around the age of six or seven, when the Somali Civil War broke out, he and his family moved to Yemen to join his father, who had taken up teaching. In 1999, Abdi and his family relocated to Minneapolis, Minnesota, where there is a large Somali community.

He graduated from Roosevelt High School in 2003 and attended Minnesota State University Moorhead. The name Barkhad in the Somali language literally means cistern, with water representing life. Before entering the film industry, Abdi sold mobile phones at his brother's shop at a mall in Minneapolis. 
He also worked as a limousine driver at a relative's chauffeur company and as a DJ.

Career

Abdi made his debut in the 2013 film Captain Phillips, playing ship hijacker and pirate leader Abduwali Muse. He was cast following a worldwide search for the lead roles. Abdi and three other actors were chosen from more than 700 participants at a 2011 casting call in Minneapolis. According to the casting director, the four were selected because they were "the chosen ones, that anointed group that stuck out".

He was paid $65,000 for his appearance in the film and returned to working in his brother's shop afterwards. For his work, Abdi was nominated for the Screen Actors Guild Award for Best Supporting Actor, the Academy Award for Best Supporting Actor, a Golden Globe Award, and a BAFTA Award for Best Supporting Actor, the latter of which he won. Abdi's experience in Captain Phillips was his first in the film industry.

In 2015, Abdi appeared in an episode of the series Hawaii Five-0, playing former warlord Roko Makoni. Later that year, he began work on the comedy film Trainwreck, though he did not appear in the finished film. He appeared in the 2015 thriller Eye in the Sky as Kenyan undercover agent Jama Farah, and he had a role in The Brothers Grimsby.

In the 2017 film The Pirates of Somalia, Abdi played the Somali government-sponsored local agent and translator for Canadian freelance journalist Jay Bahadur. His character coordinates interviews between local pirate leaders and Bahadur, who records the motivations of Somali piracy in the weeks leading up to the Maersk Alabama hijacking. In October 2017, Abdi featured in Denis Villeneuve's Blade Runner 2049, in a minor role of a scientist. Abdi made his directorial debut with the Somali film Ciyaalka Xaafada. He has directed several music videos.

In 2022, he appeared alongside Mel Gibson in Agent Game.

Philanthropy
In 2013, Abdi began to serve as an Ambassador for Adeso, a non-governmental organisation founded by the Somali environmentalist Fatima Jibrell.

Personal life
Before entering the film industry, Abdi sold mobile phones at his brother's shop at a mall in Minneapolis.
Currently he resides in Los Angeles, California, as well as Cedar-Riverside, Minneapolis, Minnesota. The bump on his forehead is from a car accident he was in prior to auditioning for Captain Phillips.

Filmography

Film

Television

Awards and nominations

References

External links

Barkhad Abdi on Conan, Dec. 17, 2013

1985 births
Living people
Best Supporting Actor BAFTA Award winners
Somalian emigrants to the United States
Somalian male actors
African-American male actors
21st-century American male actors
People from Mogadishu
Male actors from Minneapolis
Male actors from Minnesota
Minnesota State University Moorhead alumni
Somali DJs
Roosevelt High School (Minnesota) alumni
African-American Muslims